Charles Carroll Yerkes (June 13, 1903 – December 20, 1950) was a professional baseball pitcher. Over the course of five seasons in Major League Baseball, he played for the Philadelphia Athletics (1927–29) and Chicago Cubs (1932–33).

External links

Major League Baseball pitchers
Philadelphia Athletics players
Chicago Cubs players
Dover Senators players
Portland Beavers players
Los Angeles Angels (minor league) players
Reading Keystones players
Albany Senators players
Baltimore Orioles (IL) players
Seattle Indians players
Baseball players from Pennsylvania
1903 births
1950 deaths